Thomas Michel (born 1955) is a Professor in Medicine at Harvard Medical School interested in the intracellular pathways regulating the endothelial isoform of nitric oxide synthase (eNOS).  He is a well-regarded researcher and educator. Between June 2008 and 2010, Thomas Michel was named Dean for Education at Harvard Medical School.

He graduated from Harvard College and Duke University School of Medicine.

References
Harvard profile
Laboratory website

Living people
American medical researchers
Harvard Medical School faculty
1955 births
Harvard College alumni
Duke University School of Medicine alumni